Jacob Heidtmann (born 6 November 1994) is a retired German swimmer. He competed in the men's 4 × 200 metre freestyle relay and the 400 metre medley event at the 2016 Summer Olympics.

References

External links
 

1994 births
Living people
German male swimmers
German male freestyle swimmers
Olympic swimmers of Germany
Swimmers at the 2016 Summer Olympics
European Aquatics Championships medalists in swimming
Swimmers at the 2020 Summer Olympics
People from Pinneberg
Sportspeople from Schleswig-Holstein